Oliver Oscar Emanuel Ekman-Larsson (born 17 July 1991) is a Swedish professional ice hockey defenceman and alternate captain for the Vancouver Canucks of the National Hockey League (NHL). Known by his initials "OEL", Ekman-Larsson was originally selected sixth overall by the Phoenix Coyotes in the 2009 NHL Entry Draft. Previously seen by many as one of the NHL's top offensive defenceman, Ekman-Larsson led the Coyotes in scoring in both the 2014–15 and 2015–16 seasons.

Playing career
Ekman-Larsson began his career at the Tingsryds AIF hockey club of the HockeyAllsvenskan during the 2007–08 season, recording 8 points in 27 games. He continued his career with Leksands IF, where he scored 44 points in two seasons in 2008–09 and 2009–10 in a total of 81 games. This season would be his last, as he would he drafted by the National Hockey League's Phoenix Coyotes.

Phoenix / Arizona Coyotes (2010–2021) 

Ekman-Larsson was selected sixth overall by Phoenix in the 2009 NHL Entry Draft. On 24 May 2010, it was announced the Coyotes had signed Ekman-Larsson to an entry-level contract. In the season following his draft selection, Ekman-Larsson produced the second-most points among junior players in the Allsvenskan, despite missing several games while competing in the 2010 World Junior Ice Hockey Championships for Sweden.

Ekman-Larsson recorded his first career NHL point through an assist on a Kyle Turris goal on 23 October 2010. He scored his first career NHL goal on 17 January 2011, against goaltender Antti Niemi of the San Jose Sharks.

For the duration of the 2012–13 NHL lockout, Ekman-Larsson (on the last year of his entry-level contract) was assigned to Phoenix's American Hockey League (AHL) affiliate, the Portland Pirates.

On 6 March 2014, Ekman-Larsson scored his 100th NHL career point in a 5–2 victory over the Montreal Canadiens. With Ekman-Larsson's contribution, it was the first time since 9 December 1998 the Coyotes had defeated Montreal. At the conclusion of the 2013–14 season, Ekman-Larsson finished seventh in balloting for the James Norris Memorial Trophy, awarded annually to the NHL's top defenceman during the regular season. His votes included three first-place votes, one second-place vote and two third-place votes. On 16 December 2014, during the 2014–15 season, Ekman-Larsson tied the Coyotes' franchise record for overtime-winning goals by a player in a single season after scoring his third of the season with 0.03 seconds left in overtime in a 2–1 win over the Edmonton Oilers. Ekman-Larsson represented Arizona in the 2015 NHL All-Star Game, assisting on a goal by Bobby Ryan. Ekman-Larsson finished the 2014–15 season with 23 goals and 20 assists. With this career milestone, Ekman-Larsson broke Nicklas Lidström's NHL record, becoming the first Swedish-born defenceman in NHL history to score more than 20 goals in one season. Ekman-Larsson's 23 goals were the most scored by an NHL defenceman that season and tied Phil Housley's franchise record for most goals scored by a defenceman in a season.

On 29 January 2015, during a game against the Toronto Maple Leafs, Ekman-Larsson scored the fastest shorthanded goal to start a period in NHL history, against Jonathan Bernier five seconds into the third period. On 19 December 2015, during a game against the New York Islanders, Ekman-Larsson scored the lone goal of the game, which proved to be the game-winning goal. With this goal, Ekman-Larsson surpassed Teppo Numminen's franchise record for the most game-winning goals by a defenceman with the 20th in his career. On 12 January 2016, Ekman-Larsson assisted on all three goals of rookie Max Domi's first career hat-trick, and would later go on to set a career-high four-point night by scoring the overtime-winning goal against the Edmonton Oilers. On 24 March, Ekman-Larsson inadvertently scored the game-winning goal in a 3–1 win over the Dallas Stars. Initially credited to teammate Martin Hanzal, after further review the goal was shown to bounce off a Dallas player and into the net. With this game-winning goal, Ekman-Larsson set an NHL record for the most game-winning goals by a defenceman in a single season with eight, surpassing Tim Horton, Al MacInnis, Ray Bourque, Derek Morris and Dion Phaneuf. He became just the second defenceman in franchise history to record 20 or more goals in consecutive seasons, after Phil Housley. Ekman-Larsson finished the 2015–16 season ninth in balloting for the James Norris Memorial Trophy.

In the 2016–17 season, on 18 March 2017, during a game against the Nashville Predators, Ekman-Larsson scored his 40th career powerplay goal (against Pekka Rinne), tying Fredrik Olausson for the most by a defenceman in Arizona Coyotes/Winnipeg Jets history. On 3 April 2017, with the Coyotes out of playoff contention, Ekman-Larsson was granted a leave of absence for the remaining three regular seasons games in order to return to his native Sweden due to the death of his mother, following a prolonged battle with cancer.

On 14 October 2017, in a game against the Boston Bruins, Ekman-Larsson scored his first powerplay goal of the season against Anton Khudobin and moved ahead of Fredrik Olausson for the franchise record for powerplay goals scored by a defenceman with his 41st. On 10 January 2018, Ekman-Larsson was selected as the lone Coyotes representative at the 2018 NHL All-Star Game. On 10 March, Ekman-Larsson was fined $5,000 for slashing Sven Andrighetto. After the regular season concluded and the Coyotes again failed to make the playoffs, Ekman-Larsson was nominated for the King Clancy Memorial Trophy, awarded to the player who best exemplifies leadership qualities on and off the ice and gives back to his community. On 1 July 2018, Ekman-Larsson signed an eight-year, $66 million contract extension with the Coyotes; he was set to become a free agent the following season. He was later named captain of the Coyotes.

Vancouver Canucks (2021–present)
On 23 July 2021, Ekman-Larsson waived his no-movement clause and was traded, along with Conor Garland, to the Vancouver Canucks in exchange for Jay Beagle, Loui Eriksson, Antoine Roussel, a 2021 first-round pick (Dylan Guenther), a 2022 second-round pick and a 2023 seventh-round pick. Arizona retained twelve percent of Ekman-Larsson's salary as part of the transaction. He scored his first goal as a Canuck on October 13, 2021 in a 3-2 shootout loss to the Edmonton Oilers.  On April 7, 2022, Ekman-Larsson played his first game back at the Arizona Coyotes and got an assist in a 5-1 win.

International play

Ekman-Larsson represented Sweden at the 2010 World Junior Championships, where he was the highest-scoring defenceman on the team, scoring five points in six games.

At the 2010 World Championships, Ekman-Larsson played in nine games for the bronze medalists and was deemed to be Sweden's best player in the game against Norway.

In 2019, at the 2019 World Championships, Ekman-Larsson was named captain of Sweden's international team.

Personal life
Ekman-Larsson's maternal grandfather, Kenneth Ekman, also a defenceman, was selected to represent Sweden at the 1972 Winter Olympics. Swedish international footballer Amanda Ilestedt is Ekman-Larsson's cousin. Ekman-Larsson's younger brother, Kevin, was previously signed with the Coyotes' AHL affiliate, the Tucson Roadrunners. He now plays in Sweden with second-tier club BIK Karlskoga.

In 2013, Ekman-Larsson founded OEL, a luxury clothing line based in Sweden. Ekman-Larsson donates a lot of his free time as well as free tickets to Arizona Coyote games to various charities like Big Brothers Big Sisters, the Arizona Burn Foundation, the Wounded Warrior Project and Best Buddies.  In 2017 Ekman-Larsson lost his mom to cancer mid-season. In 2019 Ekman-Larsson and fellow Arizona Coyotes welcomed a terminal cancer patient Leighton Arcardo into the organization, with Ekman-Larsson insisting she do the team's face-off.  In 2019, he sold his $6.5 million house in Paradise Valley, Arizona to Milwaukee Brewers left fielder Christian Yelich.

Records
 Most game-winning goals by a defenceman in a single NHL season – 8 goals
 First Swedish-born defenceman in NHL history to score more than 20 goals in a single season – 23 goals
 Fastest shorthanded goal to begin a period in NHL history – 5 seconds
 Most powerplay goals by a defenceman in Arizona Coyotes franchise history – 41 goals
 Most goals by a defenceman in Arizona Coyotes franchise history – 128 goals

Career statistics

Regular season and playoffs

International

Awards and honours

References

External links
 

1991 births
Living people
Arizona Coyotes draft picks
Arizona Coyotes players
Ice hockey players at the 2014 Winter Olympics
Leksands IF players
Medalists at the 2014 Winter Olympics
National Hockey League All-Stars
National Hockey League first-round draft picks
Olympic ice hockey players of Sweden
Olympic medalists in ice hockey
Olympic silver medalists for Sweden
People from Karlskrona
Phoenix Coyotes players
Portland Pirates players
San Antonio Rampage players
Swedish expatriate ice hockey players in the United States
Swedish ice hockey defencemen
Tingsryds AIF players
Vancouver Canucks players
Sportspeople from Blekinge County